Paramarpissa is a genus of North American jumping spiders that was first described by Frederick Octavius Pickard-Cambridge in 1901. Originally considered a synonym of Pseudicius, it was separated into its own genus in 1999.

Species
 it contains six species, found only in Mexico and the United States:
Paramarpissa albopilosa (Banks, 1902) – USA, Mexico
Paramarpissa griswoldi Logunov & Cutler, 1999 – USA, Mexico
Paramarpissa laeta Logunov & Cutler, 1999 – Mexico
Paramarpissa piratica (Peckham & Peckham, 1888) – USA, Mexico
Paramarpissa sarta Logunov & Cutler, 1999 – Mexico
Paramarpissa tibialis F. O. Pickard-Cambridge, 1901 (type) – Mexico

References

Salticidae genera
Salticidae
Spiders of Mexico
Spiders of the United States
Taxa named by Frederick Octavius Pickard-Cambridge